The 1938 Washington Senators won 75 games, lost 76, and finished in fifth place in the American League. They were managed by Bucky Harris and played home games at Griffith Stadium.

Offseason 
 December 1, 1937: Ed Linke was traded by the Senators to the St. Louis Browns for Elon Hogsett.

Regular season

Season standings

Record vs. opponents

Notable transactions 
 May 4, 1938: Harry Kelley was selected off waivers by the Senators from the Philadelphia Athletics.

Roster

Player stats

Batting

Starters by position 
Note: Pos = Position; G = Games played; AB = At bats; H = Hits; Avg. = Batting average; HR = Home runs; RBI = Runs batted in

Other batters 
Note: G = Games played; AB = At bats; H = Hits; Avg. = Batting average; HR = Home runs; RBI = Runs batted in

Pitching

Starting pitchers 
Note: G = Games pitched; IP = Innings pitched; W = Wins; L = Losses; ERA = Earned run average; SO = Strikeouts

Other pitchers 
Note: G = Games pitched; IP = Innings pitched; W = Wins; L = Losses; ERA = Earned run average; SO = Strikeouts

Relief pitchers 
Note: G = Games pitched; W = Wins; L = Losses; SV = Saves; ERA = Earned run average; SO = Strikeouts

Farm system 

LEAGUE CHAMPIONS: Charlotte, Salisbury

Notes

References 
1938 Washington Senators at Baseball-Reference
1938 Washington Senators team page at www.baseball-almanac.com

Minnesota Twins seasons
Washington Senators season
1938 in sports in Washington, D.C.